Lan Jen Chu (1913–1973) was a noted electrical engineer and a professor of electrical engineering at the Massachusetts Institute of Technology (MIT). Chu is noted for his work on the fundamental limitations for small antennas, also known as Chu's limit.

Biography
Lan Jen Chu was born on August 24, 1913, in Huai'an in the Jiangsu province of China. He graduated from Shanghai Jiao Tong University in 1934 with a Bachelor of Science degree in electrical power, and went on to receive Master of Science and Doctorate of Science degrees in electrical engineering from MIT in 1935 and 1938, respectively. Chu was with the Radiation Laboratory at MIT from 1942 to 1946 and with the Department of Electrical Engineering from 1947 to 1973.

During World War II, Chu supervised research at MIT of many special antennas for use in radar and telecommunication applications. He has also authored three technical books, two of which were with Richard Adler and Robert Fano in the area of electromagnetics.  Lan Jen Chu was a fellow of the American Physical Society and the Institute of Radio Engineers, as well as a member of Academia Sinica.

References

1913 births
1973 deaths
Chinese electrical engineers
Fellows of the American Physical Society
National Chiao Tung University (Shanghai) alumni
Fellow Members of the IEEE
Republic of China (1912–1949) emigrants to the United States
Microwave engineers
20th-century Chinese engineers
Members of Academia Sinica